is a former Japanese football player and manager. He managed Japan women's national team.

Playing career
Suzuki was born in Saitama on 29 April 1947. After graduating from Rikkyo University, he played for Nissan Motors from 1972 to 1974.

Coaching career
From 1975, Suzuki became coach for Nissan Motors. He managed for Nissan Motors (1985) and Nissan FC Ladies (1987–1989).

In 1989, he became manager for Japan women's national team. He managed 3 world tournament, 1991, 1995 World Cup and 1996 Summer Olympics. In Asia, Japan won 2nd place 4 times, AFC Women's Championship (1991, 1995) and Asian Games (1990, 1994). He resigned after 1996 Summer Olympics and Satoshi Miyauchi became a new manager.

In August 1996, he became manager for Nikko Securities Dream Ladies and won L.League champions for 3 years in a row to 1998. However, the club was disbanded due to financial strain end of 1998 season.

In June 1999, Japan under manager Miyauchi was defeated in group stage at 1999 World Cup and failure to qualify for 2000 Summer Olympics. After the 1999 World Cup, Suzuki became a manager for Japan national team again and managed Japan at 1999 AFC Women's Championship in November. Japan finished at the 4th place and he resigned end of the championship.

References

1947 births
Living people
Rikkyo University alumni
Association football people from Saitama Prefecture
Japanese footballers
Japan Soccer League players
Yokohama F. Marinos players
Japanese football managers
Japan women's national football team managers
1991 FIFA Women's World Cup managers
1995 FIFA Women's World Cup managers
Sportspeople from Saitama (city)
Association footballers not categorized by position